The Bells of the Old Town (Swedish: Klockorna i Gamla sta'n) is a 1946 Swedish drama film directed by Ragnar Hyltén-Cavallius and starring Edvard Persson, George Fant and Elsie Albiin. It was shot at the Sundbyberg Studios of Europa Film in Stockholm. The film's sets were designed by the art director Max Linder. It was the first Swedish feature film to be shot in colour, using the Cinecolor process.

Synopsis
Carl Magnus Berg is a kind-hearted bailiff operating in the Old Town of Stockholm. He takes pity on a struggling jazz musician and his girlfriend Karin.

Cast
 Edvard Persson as Carl Magnus Berg
 George Fant as 	Bengt Florin
 Elsie Albiin as Karin
 Gunnel Broström as 	Harriet von Borch
 Gösta Cederlund as 	Johan Fredrik Morén
 Torsten Hillberg as 	Chief bailiff
 Axel Högel as 	Fager
 John Norrman as 	Efraim Nilsson
 Aurore Palmgren as 	Mrs. Karlsson 
 Ulla Wikander as 	Irma
 Harry Ahlin as 	Jochum
 Gösta Gustafson as 	Smygen Eriksson
 Åke Jensen as 	Ebbe
 Jarl Hamilton as 	Claes
 Greta Liming as 	Anne-Grethe
 Ebba Wrede as 	Flapper #1
 Marie-Louise Martins as 	Flapper #2
 Elsa Ebbesen as 	Mrs. Nilsson
 Olga Appellöf as 	Hildur Larsson 
 Gabriel Alw as 	Debt Collector 
 Wiktor Andersson as 	Distrainor
 Erland Colliander as 	Distrainor 
 Hartwig Fock as 	Distrainor
 Georg Fernqvist as 	Janitor
 Robert Ryberg as 	Maître d' 
 Ingvar Kjellson as 	Guest at the Party

References

Bibliography 
 Qvist, Per Olov & von Bagh, Peter. Guide to the Cinema of Sweden and Finland. Greenwood Publishing Group, 2000.
 Sundholm, John. Historical Dictionary of Scandinavian Cinema. Scarecrow Press, 2012.

External links 
 

1946 films
Swedish drama films
1946 drama films
1940s Swedish-language films
Films directed by Ragnar Hyltén-Cavallius
Films set in Stockholm
Films shot in Stockholm
Cinecolor films
1940s Swedish films